The Division 2 season 1998/1999, organised by the LFP was won by AS Saint-Étienne and saw the promotions of AS Saint-Étienne, CS Sedan Ardennes and Troyes AC, whereas Red Star Saint-Ouen and AS Beauvais were relegated to National.

20 participating teams

 Ajaccio
 Amiens
 Beauvais
 Caen
 Cannes
 Châteauroux
 Gueugnon
 Guingamp
 Laval
 Le Mans
 Lille
 Nice
 Nîmes
 Niort
 Red Star
 Saint-Étienne
 Sedan
 Troyes
 Valence
 Wasquehal

League table

Recap
 Promoted to L1 : AS Saint-Étienne, CS Sedan Ardennes, Troyes AC 
 Relegated to L2 : FC Lorient, FC Sochaux-Montbéliard, Toulouse FC
 Promoted to L2 : CS Louhans-Cuiseaux, US Créteil 
 Relegated to National : Red Star Saint-Ouen, AS Beauvais (ASOA Valence were not relegated because Gazélec Ajaccio was not allowed to compete in Division 2)

Results

Top goalscorers

External links
RSSSF archives of results

Ligue 2 seasons
French
2